Novopetrovsk may refer to:
Novopetrovsk, former name of the town of Aktau, Kazakhstan
Novopetrovsk-2, former name of the closed urban-type settlement of Voskhod, Moscow Oblast, Russia

See also

Novopetrovka
Novopetrovsky (disambiguation)
Petrovsk (disambiguation)
Petrovsky (disambiguation)